Lappatubby Creek is a stream in the U.S. state of Mississippi.

Lappatubby is a name derived from a Native American language (Choctaw or Chickasaw) purported to mean "buck killer". A variant name is "Lappatuppy Creek".

References

Rivers of Mississippi
Rivers of Pontotoc County, Mississippi
Rivers of Union County, Mississippi
Mississippi placenames of Native American origin